Pabbi is a tehsil located in Nowshera District, Khyber-Pakhtunkhwa,  Pakistan. The tehsil is named after the Pabbi town, which is located on the GT Road.

Overview 
Pabbi become tehsil in 2008, when NWFP (now Khyber Pakhtunkhwa) caretaker chief minister Shamsul Mulk declared it a tehsil of Nowshera district. The head quarter of Pabbi tehsil is Pabbi town, which is located on Grand Trunk (GT) road.

Pabbi tehsil covers the jurisdiction from Taro Jabba to Azakhel Payan and Cherat.  Pabbi is 20 kilometers (12 miles) from Peshawar, the capital of Khyber Pukhtunkhwa province.

Pabbi is a birthplace of Gul Hassan Khan was a former lieutenant-general and the last Commander-in-Chief of Pakistan Army.

Pabbi is hub of precast concrete industries located at main GT road in Chowki Mumraiz. Currently, there are 43 precast concrete industries are functional in Pabbi which supply different items to the entire Khyber Paktunkhwa and to some parts of the Punjab.

Administration 
Pabbi is a part of Pakistan National Assembly seat NA-5 (Nowshera-1) while for KP Provincial Assembly it is part of PK-12 Nowshera-I.

The population of Pabbi Tehsil, according to the 2017 census, is 437,301 while according to the 1998 census, it was 246,120.

Towns and Villages 
The main towns of Pabbi Tehsil are Pabbi, Akbarpura and Jelozai. The main villages in Pabbi are below.

 Amankot
 Azakhel Payan
 Azakhel Bala
 Bakhti
 Chand Bibi
 Chapri
 Chowki Drab
 Chowki Mumraiz
 Dag Behsood
 Dagi Jadeed
 Dak Ismail Khel
 Jabba Khattak
 Kandi Taza Din
 Kotli Kalan
 Mohib Banda
 Pashtun Garhi
 Saleh Khana
 Shahkot Bala
 Shahkot Payan
 Spin Khak

Education 
Pabbi tehsil is home to many excellent educational institutes. Pabbi has a campus of Abdul Wali Khan University Mardan in Pabbi town while it has a campus of University of Engineering and Technology Peshawar in Jelozai town.

It is also home to 3 degree colleges: Government College Akbarpura, Government Degree College Pabbi and Government Girls Degree College Pabbi.

See also 
 Nowshera Tehsil
 Jehangira Tehsil
 Nowshera District

References 

Populated places in Nowshera District
Tehsils of Khyber Pakhtunkhwa